Leigri Nature Reserve is a nature reserve situated in western Estonia, on Hiiumaa island.

The nature reserve consists of an area of wetlands and forest. Protected plant species that can be found in the nature reserve includes sweet gale, fir clubmoss and butterfly orchid. It also functions as breeding ground for common crane.

References

Nature reserves in Estonia
Hiiumaa Parish